Kevin Chong (born 1975) is a Canadian author. Born in Hong Kong, Chong studied at the University of British Columbia and Columbia University, where he received an MFA in fiction writing.

His first novel, Baroque-a-Nova, was published in Canada by Penguin in 2001, in the United States by Putnam in 2002, and in France by Ballard in 2002. The New York Times Book Review describes the book as "a readable, if slightly gray, coming-of-age novel." The Quill and Quire described the book as "compact, clear-sighted, and nervy. Chong's grasp of suburban tackiness is laugh-out-loud awesome, right down to the ubiquitous copies of Maclean's magazine on parental coffee tables and trick or treaters dressed as Orville Redenbacher."

His second book Neil Young Nation (2005), a non-fiction work, traces the steps of Neil Young's 1970 trip across Canada and the United States. New York Times Book Review of compared the book to  "watching an endless home movie in which a not very close friend visits all the houses he grew up in." The Georgia Straight suggested that "Still looking for happiness, community, and fulfillment, Chong is a genuine seeker-and his journey is a ride worth taking."

Chong works extensively as a freelance journalist.
He is a practitioner of the martial art-like aerobic exercise form Tae Bo, and had a minor role in the film Bloodsport II: The Next Kumite He is also active in Vancouver's underground music scene, performing jazz under his stage name, "Butterscotch Panda."

Chong lives in Vancouver, British Columbia, and is an accomplished show dog handler as well as an editor for Joyland: A hub for short fiction.

Bibliography

Novels
Baroque-a-Nova, 2001
Beauty Plus Pity, 2011

Non-fiction
Neil Young Nation: a quest, an obsession, and a true story, 2005  (Crisscrossing the continent, Chong follows the route that led Neil Young to become a musical legend.)
My Year of The Race Horse, 2012
Northern Dancer: The Legendary Horse that Inspired a Nation, 2014

References

External links 
 Official website
 Kevin Chong, profile from the Vancouver International Writers and Readers Festival.
 Neil Young Nation page on Greystone Books website

1975 births
Living people
Canadian male novelists
Columbia University School of the Arts alumni
Hong Kong emigrants to Canada
University of British Columbia alumni
Writers from Vancouver
21st-century Canadian novelists
21st-century Canadian male writers